Benugo (benúːgoʊ) is a British catering company. It operates high street cafes, restaurants, dining spaces inside public buildings as well as in-house corporate cafes. As of March 2014, Benugo had more than 70 individual locations; most of these are in London, with some locations outside including Bath, Oxford, Coventry, Edinburgh and Stirling.

History
Benugo was founded in 1998 by brothers Ben Warner and Hugo Warner in Clerkenwell, London.
 
Benugo signed its first public space contract at the Victoria & Albert Museum in 2004, and opened a restaurant, Benugo bar and kitchen, in the British Film Institute building in 2007. Further cultural sites with Benugo Bar and Kitchens include Warwick Arts Centre, in Coventry.

In 2008 the investment company WSH bought an interest in Benugo.

By 2014, the chain had about 2,000 employees.

High Street 

In 2014, Benugo operates 11 high street shops throughout London, including Clerkenwell, Curzon St, Hanover St, Luton Airport, Covent Garden, Great Portland St, Cannon St, St Pancras, Waterloo Station, Wigmore Street and Victoria.

Benugo specialises in freshly made sandwiches, salads and coffee. The company was presented with a London Lifestyle Award in 2011 as London's Coffee Shop of the Year and 2013.

Public spaces 

In addition to the high street business, Benugo also runs the cafes and restaurants in a number of public spaces, including the Victoria and Albert Museum. The company provides catering facilities in the Natural History Museum, The Science Museum, and most recently The British Museum and Wellcome Collection in 2012 and 2013 respectively. In 2013, Benugo began planning a bar and café at the English National Opera. As of 2015, this development is not yet complete.

Benugo also operates ten restaurants in or next to other cultural and public spaces including at the Museum of London, the Bishopsgate Institute, in Hyde Park, at Westminster Abbey, at National Museums Scotland,  in Lincoln's Inn Fields and at Willen Lake in Milton Keynes.

The club at the House of St Barnabas 

In 2013, Benugo opened The Club restaurant and bar at the House of St Barnabas,  and is part of the charity's employment academy. Benugo guarantees to take on a certain number of graduates from the charity's academy per year and also agrees to train them for careers in hospitality within the club.

References

External links 
  
Benugo on Twitter
Benugo on Facebook

Restaurants established in 1998
Catering and food service companies of the United Kingdom
Companies based in the London Borough of Islington
1998 establishments in the United Kingdom